Michael O'Connell may refer to:

 Michael O'Connell (artist) (1898–1976), English modernist artist
 Michael O'Connell (footballer) (born 1962), former Australian rules footballer
 Michael O'Connell (politician), Irish Labour Party politician and Lord Mayor of Cork
 Michael O'Connell (botanist), professor of botany, National University of Ireland, Galway
 Michael F. O'Connell (1877–?), Wisconsin politician
 Mike O'Connell (born 1955), former professional ice hockey player and general manager
 Mick O'Connell (born 1937), former Irish Gaelic footballer
 Mick O'Connell (hurler) (1900–1966), Irish hurler in the 1920s and 1930s

See also
 Mike Connell (disambiguation)